Thammasat Stadium is a multi-purpose stadium in the city of Rangsit, Pathum Thani, Thailand.  It is currently used mostly for football matches.  The stadium holds 25,000. It is on Thammasat University's Rangsit campus. It is located close to Bangkok.

History 
It was built for the 1998 Asian Games by construction firm Christiani & Nielsen, the same company that constructed the Democracy Monument in Bangkok.

Its appearance resembles a scaled-down version of Rajamangala Stadium. The tribunes form a continuous ring that is quite low behind each goal but rises up on each side. Unlike Rajamangala though, Thammasat has a roof covering both side tribunes. Most striking about this stadium are the floodlights. Thai architects usually favor concrete pylons but these are the steel variety. As viewed from the exterior of the stadium the base of each pylon seems to grip the outside of the stadium and they dramatically lean over the tribunes so as to better illuminate the playing area.

Thammasat was going to be used for PEA FC's match against Singapore Armed Forces FC in an Asian Champions League qualifier in February 2009. Still, the pitch was deemed unplayable and the match was switched to Rajamangala.

Facilities 
The Stadium
Thammasat Water Sport Center
Gymnasium 1
Gymnasium 2
Gymnasium 3
Gymnasium 4
Gymnasium 5
Gymnasium 6
Gymnasium 7

Historical tenants

Tenants of Thammasat stadium have been Thai professional football clubs as follows.
 PEA in 2001–2002
 INSEE Police F.C. in 2011–2014
 Dome in 2015–present
 Bangkok United in 2016–present

International football matches

Football at the 1998 Asian Games – Women's tournament

2020 AFC U-23 Championship

2022 AFF Championship

References

External links
Christiani & Nielsen site

Football venues in Thailand
Sports venues in Pathum Thani Province
Venues of the 1998 Asian Games
Asian Games athletics venues
Asian Games football venues
Multi-purpose stadiums in Thailand
Sports venues completed in 1998
1998 establishments in Thailand
Asian Games water polo venues